6 Intelligence Company (6 Int Coy;) is a military intelligence unit of the Canadian Army.  It is a line unit that falls directly under 3rd Canadian Division command, which is headquartered in Edmonton. The company is divided into three platoons, which are located in Vancouver, Winnipeg, and Edmonton, with a detachment in Calgary. The members of the unit are recruited from other military trades as well as from various civilian organizations. The intelligence operators and intelligence officers of the unit train regularly in order to support domestic and foreign missions at the tactical,  operational, and strategic levels.

Lineage
The unit history dates to August 30, 1950, when No. 4 Intelligence Training Company was formed in Vancouver (though the formation of the unit was announced by Army headquarters February 27, 1950).  On July 15, 1956, the minister of national defence approved the relocation of a detachment to Edmonton. Two years later Western Command proposed that the detachment in Edmonton should form a new company; however the chief of general staff rejected the proposal at the time. On February 7, 1962, the detachment was formally designated No. 6 Intelligence Training Company, and Captain John Singer was appointed the first commanding officer.

See also

 Military history of Canada
 History of the Canadian Army
 Canadian Forces
 Intelligence Branch (Canadian Forces)
 2 Intelligence Company
 3 Intelligence Company
 4 Intelligence Company

References

Sources

External links
6 Intelligence Company
Canadian Intelligence Corps (C Int C), History & Insignia 

Intelligence units and formations of Canada
Military units and formations established in 1993
Companies of the Canadian Army